Haldia Energy Limited Power Station is a coal-based thermal power plant located at Jhikurkhali village near Haldia town in Purba Medinipur district in the Indian state of West Bengal. The power plant is operated by Haldia Energy Limited, a fully owned subsidiary of CESC Limited.

Capacity
It has a capacity of 600 MW (2x300 MW).

References

External links

 Haldia Energy power station at SourceWatch

Coal-fired power stations in West Bengal
Purba Medinipur district
Companies based in Kolkata
Energy infrastructure completed in 2015
2015 establishments in West Bengal